St Fatima School is a school in Nasr City, Cairo, Egypt. Established in 1982, the school serves students in preschool through secondary stages of education. It's mostly known for its IGCSE (British) division,].

Curriculum
The curriculum students follow is dependent on which division of the school they choose to attend. The Language Division follows the Egyptian National Curriculum; the British Division, the British curriculum; and the American Division, the American curriculum.

References

External links
 Official website

Education in Cairo
Educational institutions established in 1982
Schools in Egypt
1982 establishments in Egypt